Vriesea sulcata is a plant species in the family Bromeliaceae. This species is endemic to Venezuela.

References

sulcata
Endemic flora of Venezuela